Argentina held national legislative elections on 26 October 1997. This election was the second time of the peronist Justicialist Party defeated since 1985, while Justicialist Party maintained control of the Congress.

Background
President Carlos Menem, who successfully campaigned to have the Argentine Constitution amended in 1994 largely for the sake of being eligible for a second term in office, won the 1995 election in a landslide. The clouds of recession gathered immediately, however, as Argentine business confidence struggled following the shock of the Mexican peso crisis. Unemployment in Argentina, already higher as a result of a wave of imports and sharp gains in productivity after 1990, leapt from 12% to 18% in the first half of 1995 and, as Argentines geared for the 1997 parliamentary mid-term elections two years later, the figure remained around 15% and wages, frozen at their 1994 level.

Themselves beset by sharp divisions over how to confront President Menem, whose longtime pragmatism had given way to increasingly doctrinaire conservatism, the Justicialists' mainstay of support, the CGT labor union, joined smaller unions, leftist activists and the progressive FrePaSo (the runners-up in the 1995 elections) in a series of general strikes beginning August 1996.

Economic problems also led to a sudden increase in crime, particularly property crime, even during the vigorous recovery during 1996–97.  Menem's erstwhile "ace of spades," Economy Minister Domingo Cavallo, whose Convertibility Plan was lauded as the reason behind the "Argentine miracle" between 1991 and 1994 (in which the economy, following 16 years of zero growth, expanded by a third), became unpopular during the recession and strained relations with the President after publicly denouncing the influence of "mafias" within the administration. Cavallo was acrimoniously dismissed by the President in July 1996; but the January 1997 murder of Noticias newsmagazine photojournalist José Luis Cabezas and the subsequent implication of transport magnate Alfredo Yabrán in the crime lent credence to Cavallo's accusations and cost the ruling Justicialist Party further approval.

Presented with a unique opportunity following his once mighty party's poor showing at the 1995 polls, former president and UCR leader Raúl Alfonsín negotiated an alliance with the center-left FrePaSo and, though in a number of provinces - including the second-largest (Córdoba) - the UCR and FrePaSo ran on different slates, the Alliance won a majority of congressional seats in 13 of 23 provinces and in the city of Buenos Aires. The results marked the twilight of Menemists' dominance of Argentine politics.

Results

References 

1997
1997 elections in Argentina
Presidency of Carlos Menem